Whiteberry may refer to:

Actaea pachypoda, a species of flowering plant known as white-berry snakeroot, or simply whiteberry
Whiteberry (music group), a Japanese pop rock group

See also
Cornus sericea, known as white-berry dogwood
Pseudotaxus, known as whiteberry yew